Finland women's national inline hockey team is the national inline hockey team for Finland. The team finished seventh at the 2011 Women's World Inline Hockey Championships.

History 
Finland claimed bronze at the 2017 Women's Inline Hockey European Championship in Boskovice, Czech Republic, the team's first medal in international competition. The roster featured a number of players from the Finnish national ice hockey team, including captain Minttu Tuominen, Annina Rajahuhta, and Susanna Tapani, among others. Aino Karppinen was Finland's top point scorer, earning thirteen points across six games.

Finland returned to the Inline Hockey World Championship in 2018 and rose from the lower division to claim fifth place in the tournament. Tuominen was the leading point scorer of the tournament, notching ten goals and nine assists for a total of 19 points in seven games. She was joined at the top of the scoring board by teammates Marisa Klemola, who ranked second with 17 points, and Mia Heikuri, who ranked fifth with 14 points.

World Championship results by year 
Record of the Finnish national team in the women's tournament of the Inline Hockey World Championships, organized by the Fédération Internationale de Roller Sports (FIRS) during 2002 to 2015, and by World Skate during 2016 to present.

References 

National inline hockey teams
Inline hockey
Inline hockey in Finland